San Marino competed at the 1996 Summer Olympics in Atlanta, United States.

Archery

In its second Olympic archery competition, San Marino was represented by one man.  He lost his first match.

Men's Individual Competition:
 Paolo Tura – Round of 64 (→ 62nd place), 0-1

Athletics

Men
Track & road events

Judo

Loris Mularoni

Sailing

Luca Belluzzi

Shooting

Francesco Amici
Nadia Marchi

Swimming

Diego Mularoni

References

Nations at the 1996 Summer Olympics
1996
Summer Olympics